Soldatskoye is a rural locality (a selo) and the administrative center of Soldatskoye Rural Settlement, Starooskolsky District, Belgorod Oblast, Russia. The population was 1,269 as of 2010. There are 34 streets.

Geography 
Soldatskoye is located 36 km southeast of Stary Oskol (the district's administrative centre) by road. Gudayevka is the nearest rural locality.

References 

Rural localities in Starooskolsky District
Nizhnedevitsky Uyezd